Elin McCoy is an American wine and spirits columnist for Bloomberg Markets, international wine judge, and a contributor to publications such as Food & Wine, The New York Times, House & Garden and Zester Daily.

Education
McCoy obtained her degree from the University of Pennsylvania and later attended graduate school at the University of London and New York University.

Books
McCoy is the author of the 2005 book The Emperor of Wine, the unauthorised biography of Robert Parker,<ref>McCoy, Elin, The New York Times (August 7, 2005). 'The Emperor of Wine' excerpt</ref> She also wrote "Reign of American Taste," co-authored "Thinking About Wine," a number of children's books, a parenting book, and a travel guide.

She has also co-authored several books with her husband John Frederick Walker, as well as a long-running column in Food & Wine''.

Career
McCoy writes a bimonthly column for Bloomberg News' global news wire along with a monthly column for Bloomberg Markets and Zesterdaily.com. For 25 years, McCoy was a contributing editor at Food & Wine. She has since worked as a columnist for House Beautiful, Las Vegas Life, Shattered, and Drink.

Personal
She is married to writer and artist John Frederick Walker. Together they live in Kent, Connecticut.

See also
List of wine personalities

References

Elin McCoy bio harpercollins.com

Footnotes

Year of birth missing (living people)
Living people
Wine critics